"Underdog" is a single by Danish singer Ida. It was released as a Digital download in Denmark on 18 March 2013. The song has peaked to number 8 on the Danish Singles Chart. The song is included on her debut studio album Seize the Day (2013).

Track listing

Chart performance

Weekly charts

Release history

References

2013 songs
Ida (singer) songs
2013 singles
Sony Music singles